The University Athletic Association of the Philippines (UAAP) men's basketball Final Four is the postseason of the men's tournament of the UAAP Basketball Championship. Other divisions of UAAP basketball, the women's and juniors', also have their own versions of the Final Four.

Since the UAAP is not a home-and-away league, the position of season host rotates among member universities, and the host pays for the arena rental and other facilities. Most Final Four games are held at the Araneta Coliseum in Quezon City, the Philippines' largest indoor arena. Other venues were the Cuneta Astrodome in Pasay, Blue Eagle Gym in Quezon City, Ninoy Aquino Stadium in Manila, and the PhilSports Arena in Pasig. Since 2012, several Final Four and championship games are now also played at the Mall of Asia Arena.

The league uses a modified Shaughnessy playoff system: the top four teams enter the playoffs, while the top two seeds are given the "twice-to-beat" advantage. This advantage for the No. 1 and No. 2 seeds is that for them to be eliminated in the semifinals, they have to be beaten twice by the No. 4 and No. 3 seeds respectively; however, they need to win only once to advance. The winners in the semifinals dispute the championship trophy in a best-of-three series.

In its institution in 1993, if a team wins all of its group stage games (the "sweep"), the sweeping team wins the championship outright. In that same year, the University of Santo Tomas (UST) won all fourteen games and were awarded the championship trophy, scrapping the postseason. As a result, the "stepladder" format was used from 1994 to 2007 if a team sweeps the group stage – the sweeping team advances outright to the best-of-three finals, while the No. 3 and No. 4 seeds face off in a playoff to face the No. 2 seed still possessing the twice-to-beat advantage. After University of the East (UE) swept the group stage in 2007 (the first since UST's sweep in 1993), they were beaten by De La Salle University 2–0 in the finals series after a 21-day layoff. As a result, the league modified the "sweeper clause" by instituting the "bonus rule" – the sweeping team has to be beaten thrice in the finals, while its opponent has to be beaten only twice. The "bonus rule" was later repealed in 2016 for most UAAP sports. In the new rule, a team which finishes the group stage has a bye to the finals and the championship is a best-of-3 series only, while the other three teams will play in a stepladder semifinals round with the number 2 seed getting a twice-to-beat advantage. The stepladder round winner advances to the finals against the sweeping team.

Until 2009, ties among teams that qualified for the playoffs, including those tied for the fourth seed, were resolved by playing a game. If there were three teams tied, two games were to be played to break the tie. By 2009, it was instituted that "common sense" will be used to break ties to avoid "senseless" games.

This list includes men's basketball games played under the Final Four format since the 1994 season, a year after the format was instituted, and one-game playoffs in which teams tied after the group stage for a Final Four berth played an extra game to determine which team clinches the higher seed in the playoffs.

Results
For the semifinal columns, the No. 1 vs. No. 4 matchup is given first.

See also
NCAA Final Four (Philippines)
List of NCAA Final Four results (Philippines)

Notes

References

Final Four results